Toshloq is an urban-type settlement in Fergana Region, Uzbekistan. It is the administrative center of Toshloq District. The town population in 1989 was 12,067 people, and 18,600 in 2016.

References

Populated places in Fergana Region
Urban-type settlements in Uzbekistan